James Pope is an American former Negro league pitcher who played in the 1930s.

Pope made his Negro leagues debut in 1931 for the Louisville Black Caps, and played for the Montgomery Grey Sox the following season. In his eight recorded games on the mound, he posted a 3–1 record with a 3.86 ERA in 42 innings pitched.

References

External links
 and Seamheads

Year of birth missing
Place of birth missing
Louisville Black Caps players
Montgomery Grey Sox players
Baseball pitchers